The Parma trolleybus system forms part of the public transport network of the city and comune of Parma, in the region of Emilia-Romagna, northern Italy.  In operation since 1953, the system presently comprises four urban routes.

History
When the Parma trolleybus system commenced operations on 25 October 1953, it consisted of three routes:

1 Stazione FS — 
2 San Leonardo — Via Montebello
3 San Lazzaro — Crocetta

One month later, on 25 November 1953, the trolleybus system's predecessor, the Parma tramway network, was closed.

In 1968, trolleybus route 1 was extended to the cemetery at Orzi di Baganza.  In 1972, route 2 was extended, but was also simultaneously converted into a diesel bus route. This has been the only closure of a trolleybus route in Parma.

In the 1980s and 1990s, the trolleybus system was expanded. On 21 November 1987, route 1 was extended from Orzi di Baganza to Strada Farnese. On 14 December 1989, bus route 4 was converted into a trolleybus route. And on 5 December 1998, bus route 5 was similarly converted.

Services
The routes comprising the present Parma trolleybus system are:

1 Stazione FS — Strada Farnese
3 San Lazzaro — Crocetta
4 Via Parigi — Via Mordacci
 5 Via Orazio — Via Chiavari

Fleet

Past fleet
The following trolleybuses previously used in Parma have since been withdrawn from service:

16 Fiat 2401 Cansa delivered 1953, nos. 001-016.
2 Fiat 2411 Cansa delivered 1959/1960, nos. 017-018.
2 Fiat 2411 Cansa delivered 1964, nos. 019-020.
9  delivered 1981, nos. 022-030. No. 021 of this series was still in service in 2013.

Current fleet
Parma's current trolleybus fleet is as follows:

1 Menarini Monocar 201 delivered 1981, no. 021; as of 2013, being retained indefinitely as it was found to be useful for de-icing (scraping ice off of the overhead wires) during winter months, when needed.
10 Menarini Monocar 201/2 delivered 1986, nos. 031-040.
14  low-floor, delivered 1997 (eight vehicles) and 2000, nos. 041-054.
10 Van Hool ExquiCity  articulated trolleybuses, built in 2012–13, nos. 5101–5110. The first unit of what was originally an order for nine was delivered in April 2012, and the first vehicles entered service on 23 April 2014, normally used on route 5 only. A tenth vehicle, no. 5110, was purchased in 2014. It was Van Hool's prototype ExquiCity trolleybus, built in 2011, before the other Parma ExquiCity units. It was not originally built for Parma, but had been manufactured to the same specifications as used by TEP.

Heritage fleet
Parma trolleybuses nos. 014 and 017 are preserved as heritage vehicles, at the TEP "I° maggio" depot.

See also

Parma railway station
List of trolleybus systems in Italy

References

Notes

Further reading

External links

Brief history of the introduction of the trolleybus service, at tep.pr.it 
Images of the Parma trolleybus system, at railfaneurope.net
Discussion of the Parma trolleybus system, on the Mondo Tram Forum 
Page on the history and status of the Parma trolleybus system. 

This article is based upon a translation of the Italian language version as at March 2011.

Parma
Parma
Parma
Transport in Emilia-Romagna